The Niagara Regional Police Service (NRPS) provides policing services for the Regional Municipality of Niagara in the Canadian province of Ontario.

The NRPS was established on January 1, 1971, and is the oldest regional police service in Ontario.  Its headquarters is located in Niagara Falls, Ontario.

Organization
The NRPS provides all general policing duties in the region, including patrol of municipal and regional roads and waterways within the region, including the Welland Canal, the Niagara River and lakes Ontario and Erie.  Patrol of provincial highways in the region, such as the Queen Elizabeth Way, is handled by the Ontario Provincial Police, while patrol services on Niagara Parks Commission property is handled by the Niagara Parks Police Service.  The NRPS is, however, mandated to investigate all major crimes in the region, including those that occur on provincial highways or on NPC property.

Police chiefs
 Albert E. Shennan January 1, 1971 - May 31, 1977
 Donald Harris May 31, 1977 - December 31, 1983
 James A. Gayder  January 1, 1984 - March 4, 1987
 John E. Shoveller  August 31, 1987 - March 1, 1993
 J. Grant Waddell March 1, 1993 - 2000
 Gary E. Nicholls  August 11, 2000 - January 1, 2005
 Wendy E. Southall January 1, 2005 - June 18, 2012
 Jeffrey McGuire June 18, 2012 – July 14, 2017
 Bryan MacCulloch July 14, 2017

Ranks and insignia

Districts
The Niagara Regional Police Service is divided into six districts:
 1 District - 198 Welland Avenue, St. Catharines
 2 District - 5700 Valley Way, Niagara Falls
 3 District - 5 Lincoln Street West, Welland
 5 District - 650 Gilmore Road, Fort Erie
 6 District - 501 Fielden Avenue, Port Colborne
 8 District - 45 Clarke Street, Grimsby
 Emergency Services - St. Catharines

Headquarters and administrative offices are located at 5700 Valley Way, Niagara Falls, Ontario. Auxiliary and support services are located on Cushman Road in St. Catharines.

Units
The Niagara Regional Police Service is broken down into units of specific responsibility.  Some of these units include

 Auxiliary police
 Canine 
 Child abuse 
 Court services 
 Community Engagement
 District detective offices
 Domestic violence 
 Emergency task  (ETU)
 Explosives disposal  (EDU)
 Forensic services 
 Central fraud 
 "Guns, Gangs and Grows" 
 Homicide 
 Marine 
 Morality
 Policy and risk management 
 Polygraph 
 Professional standards 
 Sexual assault 
 Special investigative services 
 Traffic Enforcement Unit
 District street crime 
 Collision reconstruction 
 Underwater search and recovery
 Uniform patrol officers
 Victim services / youth crime

Crest

 St. Edward's Crown
 ribbon containing the words Unity, Responsibility, Loyalty
 the shield contains:
 a golden St. Edward's Crown
 two symbols with waves representing the Welland Canal
 wreath of golden maple leaves
 Trillium of Ontario

Fleet
A partial list of the Niagara Regional Police's fleet consists of the following:

Following changes to the Ontario Highway Traffic Act in August 2007, the Niagara Regional Police Service began replacing red and white "Street Hawk" emergency lights on police vehicles with new blue and red LED lights.  Older-style light bars were gradually phased out through attrition.

Niagara Regional Police Service marked patrol vehicles have historically been white in colour. In the late 1980s to the early 1990s, they were distinguished with royal blue hoods and a single blue stripe on the sides of the vehicle. In the mid-1990s, the service adopted the crest used today, switching to blue and green stripes on the sides of patrol vehicles, and abandoning the traditional blue hoods. This striping change was relatively short lived, with the service soon adopting red and blue striping more commonly seen on police vehicles in Ontario. In 2013, the Niagara Regional Police Service commenced a re-branding of marked patrol vehicles, adopting a black and white colour scheme, with silver and red graphics, which is being phased in as vehicles are replaced through attrition.

Pipes and Drums Band

The Niagara Regional Police Pipe Band is a grade three pipe band based in Niagara Falls.

The band's pipe major is Peter MacKenzie.

There was a grade 2 pipe band in existence until the end of the 2009 season, led by Dave Goodall (pipe major) and Graham Kirkwood (drum sergeant), however, that group dissolved in fall of 2009.

Male Chorus

The Niagara Regional Police Male Chorus was formed in 1996 with the encouragement of Chief Grant Waddell to celebrate the force's twenty-fifth anniversary. With the sponsorship of Chief Waddell they were granted the right to perform.

The Niagara Regional Police Male Chorus, facing reduced numbers, was disbanded in 2011.

Mounted Unit

Members of the mounted unit are part of the force's colour guard.

There are three horses in the unit with three other horses retired. Two of the three horses are owned by the NRP.

On November 25, 2010, the Niagara Regional Mounted Unit was disbanded for budgetary reasons. The annual budget of $30,000.00 used to care for the horses was redistributed elsewhere.

Marine Unit

Because crime and the need for assistance aren't limited to land, the Niagara Regional Police Service's Marine Unit provides policing to the lakes and waterways of the Niagara Region. They conduct general patrol duties in parts of Lake Ontario, Lake Erie, the Niagara River, and other water sanctuaries within or bordering the Niagara Region. Officers in the Marine Unit enforce the Criminal Code, Narcotic, and Liquor Licence Act offences in addition to marine and navigation laws.

The Marine Unit also assists in search and rescue/search and recovery operations when required. In doing so, they work with other units within the Niagara Regional Police Service, other police services and agencies related to maritime safety or the judicial process.

Dive Unit

The mandate of the Underwater Search & Recovery Unit Diver Unit (USRU) is to extend the police function underwater with a cost effective, highly trained and equipped underwater forensic response that meets the needs of the service, the citizens of Niagara and our contracted partners. The underwater capability must be as forensically and professionally reliable as police duties that are executed on land, and meet the legislated competency requirements prescribed by CSA Z275.4-02 Competency Standard for Diving Operations.

All USRU members must be sworn police officers and certified divers before they can apply to the team. Candidates are put through a challenging Phase I: Diver Selection week where they complete a variety of tests including: basic diving knowledge; watermanship and stamina; claustrophobia and skills assessments.  This selection program ensures all the applicants have the aptitude to take part in this unique form of commercial diving.  Successful candidates then complete six weeks of qualification training based on CSA Standards to develop the requisite knowledge, skills and experience to eventually challenge a formal external audit process prescribed by the Diver Certification Board of Canada (DCBC).

The USRU assists in the forensic recovery of human remains, SCUBA fatalities, vehicle, vessel, air crash investigations, and weapons recovery. All members are certified in harbour clearing, hull searching and explosives recognition. Two members are trained in underwater explosives disposal and improvised explosive device render safe.

Since 1998, Niagara’s eight-person USRU has provided search and recovery services for the Waterloo Regional Police Service on a 24/7 contract basis.

Officers are also trained in ice rescue and swift water rescue.

Members Killed in the Line of Duty 
Since its founding, the NRPS has lost seven of its officers in the line of duty.

See also
 Integrated Security Unit
 Niagara Parks Police Service

References

External links
Niagara Regional Police Service

Law enforcement agencies of Ontario
Regional Municipality of Niagara
Politics of Niagara Falls, Ontario